

Current listings

|}

References

Pacific